Wild Earth is a safari video game and motion simulator ride by Super X Studios. The player photographs 30 types of animals as a photojournalist in Serengeti National Park. Ubisoft published the game as Wild Earth: Photo Safari for Microsoft Windows and Xbox in November 2006. Majesco later published a Wii version, Wild Earth: African Safari, in 2008. The game was also installed as a motion simulator ride in multiple American zoos. It won several awards including the grand prize at the 2003 Independent Games Festival.

Gameplay 

Wild Earth is a safari video game in which players explore and photograph African safari environments. The player acts as a photojournalist in Serengeti National Park and is set to photograph 30 different types of animals, from hyenas to rhinoceroses. In the Wii version, the controller rumbles when the player strays too close to the animals, which affects the camera's steadiness. The game was also installed as a motion simulation ride at zoos including the Philadelphia Zoo, Zoo Miami, and San Diego Zoo.

Development 

Super X, an indie developer based in Seattle, built Wild Earth for release on Xbox and Microsoft Windows. The team won the game design innovation, visual art innovation, and grand prize at the Independent Games Festival in 2003. They had previously worked on Far Gate, which won the audience award at the same festival in 2000. In December 2005, Wild Earth production was complete but Super X ended its agreement with British publisher Digital Jesters when the latter was being restructured. A year later, Super X announced that Ubisoft would publish the game. They released the game a week later, on November 16, 2006. A later agreement with Discovery Channel and Animal Planet brought the game to Europe. In 2008, Majesco announced a related and Wii-exclusive version of the title, Wild Earth: African Safari. 

On March 23, 2022, the game was re-released on Steam as Wild Earth - Africa.

Reception 

The game received "mixed" reviews, according to video game review aggregator Metacritic.

References

External links 

 

2006 video games
Seumas McNally Grand Prize winners
Single-player video games
Independent Games Festival winners
Photography games
Ubisoft games
Majesco Entertainment games
Windows games
Wii games
Xbox games
Indie video games
Video games developed in the United States